The North Smithfield School District is a school district in the Primrose section of North Smithfield, Rhode Island.  It operates two elementary schools, a middle school, and a high school.

History
During the American Revolution, one of North Smithfield's first recorded schools was founded in the home of Elisha Thornton near modern-day Slatersville.  In the 1800s many local students attended the private Bushee Academy (Smithfield Union Village Academy) in Union Village.  The first school building located near the present school in Primrose, Rhode Island was known as the "Andrews School," originally a one-room wooden school house, first constructed in 1838.  The wooden building was replaced by a larger brick building in the early twentieth century, which currently serves as the North Smithfield school superintendent's office, adjacent to the high school and middle school.  Prior to the completion of the 1989 school, North Smithfield students attended Kendall Dean School and Dr. Harry L. Halliwell School and temporarily St. Paul Street School in the late 1980s. In 2019 a large new addition to NSES was completed for additional students from the Halliwell School which closed that year.

Facilities

Elementary school
North Smithfield Elementary School which was built in 1989 (with a large addition built in 2019) and now is used for grades preschool-third grade.

Middle school
North Smithfield Middle School was built for the 2008–2009 school year which now holds grades six through eight.  Prior to its completion, North Smithfield students attended North Smithfield Junior-Senior High School held within the current high school building.

High school

North Smithfield High School is the only public high school in the town and was ranked fifth out of 51 public high schools in Rhode Island in 2016.

Closed
The Kendall Dean School was built in 1936, but is no longer used as a school, as is the Dr. Harry L. Halliwell School, which was built in 1957 and closed in 2019.

Gallery

See also
Schools in Rhode Island

References

External links

School districts in Rhode Island
Education in Providence County, Rhode Island
North Smithfield, Rhode Island
School districts established in 1936
1936 establishments in Rhode Island